Gabriel Achy Assi (born 13 November 1938) is an Ivorian boxer. He competed in the 1964 Summer Olympics.

1964 Olympic results
Below is the record of Gabriel Achy Assi, a lightweight boxer from the Ivory Coast who competed at the 1964 Tokyo Olympics:
 
 Round of 64: bye
 Round of 32: lost to Campbell Palmer (Canada) by decision, 2-3

References

1938 births
Living people
Boxers at the 1964 Summer Olympics
Ivorian male boxers
Olympic boxers of Ivory Coast
Lightweight boxers